Ghumauney Gewog is a former gewog (village block) of Samtse District, Bhutan.  Ghumauney Gewog was part of Chengmari Dungkhag, together with Chargharey, Nainital, and Chengmari Gewogs.

References 

Former gewogs of Bhutan
Samtse District